Alexa Kristen Sand is an American art historian and educator. A scholar of medieval art, Sand is currently Professor of Art History at Utah State University.

Career
Sand graduated from Williams College with a Bachelor of Arts in Art History and Anthropology in 1991, as cum laude. She continued on to earn a Master of Arts in Art History from the University of California, Berkeley in 1994. There, the subject of her thesis was Villard de Honnecourt. Five years later, Sand received a Doctor of Philosophy in Art History from the same school. Her doctoral dissertation was on the psalter of Yolande de Soissons held at the Morgan Library and Museum. It was written under the supervision of Harvey Stahl with Michael Baxandall, Joseph Duggan, and Geoffrey Koziol.

A scholar of medieval art, Sand began her teaching career at Sonoma State University in 2001 as Adjunct Professor of Art History. Three years later, she was hired at Utah State University as Assistant Professor of Art History in 2004. She was promoted to the Associate level in 2011. Six years later, Sand was made full Professor. In 2018, she also became the Associate Vice President for Research at the school.

See also
List of University of California, Berkeley alumni in arts and media
List of Utah State University faculty
List of Williams College alumni

References

External links
Utah State University profile

Year of birth missing (living people)
Living people
American art historians
American medievalists
Women art historians
Williams College alumni
University of California, Berkeley alumni
Sonoma State University faculty
Utah State University faculty